The Roman Catholic Diocese of Dipolog (Latin: Dioecesis Dipologanae; Filipino: Diyosesis ng Dipolog; Cebuano: Diyosesis sa Dipolog; Spanish: Diócesis de Dipolog) is a Roman Rite diocese of the Latin Church of the Catholic Church in the Philippines which comprises the civil province of Zamboanga del Norte. Erected in 1967 from territory in the Archdiocese of Zamboanga, the diocese is suffragan to the Archdiocese of Ozamiz.

The seat of the diocese is the Cathedral of Our Lady of the Most Holy Rosary which is located at the center of the city of Dipolog of Zamboanga del Norte. The diocese celebrated its fiftieth anniversary in 2017. Since its creation the diocese has had three bishops. The current bishop is Severo Cagatan Caermare, D.D., the first native of the diocese to become its bishop.

Ordinaries

Coat-of-Arms

See also

Catholic Church in the Philippines

References

Dipolog
Dipolog
Dipolog
Religion in Zamboanga del Norte